Heinrich Aloysius Maria Elisabeth Brüning (26 November 1885 – 30 March 1970) was a German Centre Party politician and academic, who served as the chancellor of Germany during the Weimar Republic from 1930 to 1932.

A political scientist and Christian social activist, he entered politics in the 1920s and was elected to the Reichstag in 1924. In 1930, he was appointed interim chancellor, just as the Great Depression took hold. His austerity policies in response were unpopular, with most of the Reichstag opposed, so he governed by emergency decrees issued by President Paul von Hindenburg, overriding the Reichstag. This lasted until May 1932, when his land distribution policy offended Hindenburg, who refused to issue any more decrees, and Brüning resigned.
 
After Hitler took power, Brüning fled Germany in 1934. He eventually settled in the United States. From 1937 to 1952, he was a professor at Harvard University. He returned to Germany in 1951 to teach at the University of Cologne, but again moved to the United States in 1955 and lived out his days in retirement in Vermont.

Brüning remains a controversial figure in Germany's history, as historians debate whether he was the 'last bulwark of the Weimar Republic' or the 'Republic's undertaker', or both. Scholars are divided over how much room for manoeuvre he had during the depression and period of great political instability. While he intended to protect the Republic's government, his policies, notably his use of emergency powers, also contributed to the gradual demise of the Weimar Republic during his chancellorship.

Early life and education
Born in Münster in Westphalia, Brüning lost his father when he was one year old and thus his elder brother Hermann Joseph played a major part in his upbringing. Although brought up in a devoutly Roman Catholic family, Brüning was also influenced by Lutheranism's concept of duty, since the Münster region was home to both Catholics, who formed a majority, and Prussian-influenced Protestants.

After graduating from Gymnasium Paulinum he first leaned towards the legal profession but then studied Philosophy, History, German, and Political Science at Strasbourg, the London School of Economics, and Bonn, where, in 1915, he received a doctorate for his thesis on the financial, economic, and legal implications of nationalizing the British railway system. Historian Friedrich Meinecke, one of his professors at Strasbourg, had a major influence on Brüning.

Volunteering for the infantry, he was accepted despite his shortsightedness and physical weakness, and served in World War I from 1915 to 1918. He rose to lieutenant in infantry regiment No. 30, Graf Werder, and company commander by the end of the war. He was cited for bravery and awarded both the second and first class Iron Cross.

Despite having been elected to a soldiers' council after the armistice of 11 November 1918, Brüning did not approve of the German Revolution of 1918–1919 which ended with the establishment of the Weimar Republic.

Rise in politics
Despite his reluctance to speak about his private life, it is assumed that his war experience and the war's aftermath persuaded him not to pursue his academic career, and he preferred to help former soldiers reintegrate into civilian life by assisting them finding employment or further their education.

He collaborated with the social reformer Carl Sonnenschein and worked in the "Secretariat for social student work". After six months he entered the Prussian welfare department and became a close associate of Adam Stegerwald, the minister. Stegerwald, also the leader of the Christian trade unions, made him chief executive of the unions in 1920, a post Brüning retained until 1930.

As the editor of the union newspaper Der Deutsche (The German), he advocated a "social popular state" and "Christian democracy," based on the ideas of Christian corporatism.

In 1923 Brüning was actively involved in organizing the passive resistance in the "Ruhrkampf".

Brüning joined the Centre Party and in 1924 was elected to the Reichstag, representing Breslau.

From 1928 to 1930, he served as a member of the Landtag of Prussia. In 1929, after his election as leader of the Centre Party group in the Reichstag, his party's agreement to the Young Plan was made conditional on paying for it through tax increases and budget cuts. This earned him President Paul von Hindenburg's attention.

As chancellor

In March 1930, the grand coalition under the Social Democrat Hermann Müller collapsed. Hindenburg appointed Brüning chancellor on 29 March 1930. Brüning's financial and economic acumen combined with his openness to social questions made him a candidate for chancellor and his war service as a front-line officer made him acceptable to Hindenburg.

The government faced the Great Depression. At the same time, the 1929 Young Plan had greatly reduced war reparations owed by Germany, but paying the remainder required severe austerity measures. Brüning disclosed to his associates in the German Labour Federation that his chief aim as chancellor would be to liberate the German economy from the burden of reparations and foreign debt. This would require tight credit and a deflationary rollback of all wage and salary increases (internal devaluation).

The Reichstag rejected Brüning's measures within a month. Hindenburg, already bent on reducing the influence of the Reichstag, saw this event as the "failure of parliament", and with Brüning's consent he called new elections, to be held in December.

In the meantime, Brüning's measures were implemented in the summer by presidential emergency decrees (Notverordnung) under Article 48 of the Weimar Constitution. The deflationary measures led to a trade surplus, but increased unemployment and poverty. As unemployment continued to rise, Brüning's cuts in both wages and public assistance, combined with rising prices and taxes, increased misery among workers and the unemployed. This gave rise to the slogan "Brüning verordnet Not!" ("Brüning decrees hardship"), alluding to his measures being implemented by the Notverordnung. He became extremely unpopular.

Hindenburg wished to base the government on the parties of the right, but the right-wing German National People's Party (DNVP) refused to support Brüning's government. To the president's dismay, Brüning had to rely on his own Centre Party, the only party that fully supported him, and on the toleration of the Social Democrats.

In the December election, the parties of the grand coalition lost many seats, while the Communists and the National Socialists (Nazis) made major gains. This left Brüning without any hope of forming a Reichstag majority. Instead, he continued to govern by Notverordnung. He coined the term "authoritative democracy" to describe this form of government, based on the cooperation of the president and parliament.

Brüning was somewhat ambivalent toward democracy. Soon after taking office, he sharply limited freedom of the press.  By one estimate, 100 newspaper editions were banned every month.

Brüning's harsh economic policies undermined the tacit support of the Social Democrats for the government, while the liberal and conservative members of the cabinet favoured opening the government to the right. President Hindenburg, pushed by his camarilla and military chief Kurt von Schleicher, also advocated such a move and insisted on a cabinet reshuffle, especially the removal of ministers Joseph Wirth and Theodor von Guérard, both from the Centre Party.

The president's wishes also hampered the government's resolution in combatting the extremist parties and their respective paramilitary organisations. The chancellor and president agreed that the brutality, intolerance, and demagogy of the Communists and Nazis rendered them unfit for government, and Brüning believed the government was strong enough to steer Germany through the crisis without the support of the Nazis.

Nonetheless, he negotiated with Hitler about toleration or a formal coalition, without yielding to the Nazis any position of power or full support by presidential decree. Because of these reservations the negotiations came to nothing and as street violence rose to new heights in April 1932, Brüning had both the Communist "Rotfrontkämpferbund" and the Nazi Sturmabteilung banned. The unfavourable reaction in right-wing circles further undermined Hindenburg's support for Brüning.

Brüning agonized over how to stem the growing Nazi tide, especially since Hindenburg could not be expected to survive another full term as president should he choose to run again. If Hindenburg were to die in office, Hitler would be a strong favorite to succeed him.

In his posthumously published memoirs Brüning claims, without support of contemporaneous documents, that he hit upon a last-ditch solution to prevent Hitler from taking power: restoring the Hohenzollern monarchy.  He planned to persuade the Reichstag to cancel the 1932 German presidential election and extend Hindenburg's term.  He would have then had the Reichstag proclaim a monarchy, with Hindenburg as regent.  Upon Hindenburg's death, one of Crown Prince Wilhelm's sons would have been invited to assume the throne. The restored monarchy would have been a British-style constitutional monarchy in which real power would have rested with the legislature.

He managed to garner support from all of the major parties except the Nationalists, Communists, and Nazis, making it very likely that the plan would get the two-thirds majority required for passage. The plan foundered, however, when Hindenburg, an old-line monarchist, refused to support restoration of the monarchy unless Kaiser Wilhelm II was recalled from exile in the Netherlands.  When Brüning tried to impress upon him that neither the Social Democrats nor the international community would accept any return of the deposed Kaiser, Hindenburg threw him out of his office.

Foreign policy

Despite his policies of economic austerity, Bruning pursued a nationalist-right foreign policy. He wanted  to build two battlecruisers for the Reichsmarine, and expanded German influence in central and eastern Europe, signing bilateral trade treaties with the Kingdom of Hungary and the Kingdom of Romania. Brüning tried to alleviate the burden of reparation payments and to achieve German equality in the rearmament question. In 1930, he replied to Aristide Briand's initiative to form a "United States of Europe" by demanding full equality for Germany, refusing offers of French financial assistance to help Germany's deteriorating economy.

Bruning's nationalist foreign policy chilled investment in Germany and hindered his efforts to achieve foreign loans. In 1931 plans for a customs union between Weimar Germany and the First Austrian Republic were shattered by French opposition. Bruning responded by issuing an aggressive communique demanding the nullification of the Treaty of Versailles and announcing a unilateral moratorium on German reparations. The communique led to a financial panic which depleted the Reichsbank's reserves and led to banking crises at Danatbank and Dresdner Bank. 

US President Herbert Hoover tried to avert further political and economic crisis by negotiating the Hoover Moratorium, postponing reparations and repayment of inter-Allied debts. France disapproved of the moratorium and delayed ratification long enough to trigger a banking run which collapsed Danatbank. The Reichsbank was forced to close the financial system and withdraw the Reichsmark from the gold standard. It also established import controls and nationalized foreign currency holdings. Bruning's actions caused the Bank of England to abandon the gold peg of the pound sterling, which severely worsened the Great Depression. In summer 1932, after Brüning's resignation, his successors reaped the fruits of his policy at the Lausanne conference, which reduced reparations to a final payment of 3 billion marks.

Negotiations over rearmament failed at the 1932 Geneva Conference shortly before his resignation, but in December the "Five powers agreement" accepted Germany's military equality.

Hindenburg's re-election and Brüning's fall

Hindenburg was not willing at first to stand for re-election as president, but subsequently changed his mind. In the 1932 presidential election, Brüning vigorously campaigned for Hindenburg along with virtually the entire German left and centre, calling him a "venerated historical personality" and "the keeper of the constitution". After two rounds of voting Hindenburg was re-elected with a substantial majority over his main opponent, Hitler. However, Hindenburg considered it shameful to have been elected with the votes of "Reds" and "Catholes", as he called Social Democrats and the mostly Catholic Centre Party. He realised he was considered the lesser of two evils by them, and he compensated for this "shame" by moving further to the right. His failing health increased the camarilla's influence.

As Brüning gradually lost Hindenburg's support, the ban of the Nazi SA paramilitary organisation initiated by Minister Wilhelm Groener on 13 April 1932 sharpened the conflict and led to considerable ill-feeling between Hindenburg and his trusted friend Kurt von Schleicher. At the same time, he was viciously attacked by the Prussian Junkers, led by Elard von Oldenburg-Januschau, who opposed Brüning's policies of distributing land to unemployed workers in the course of the Eastern Aid (Osthilfe) programme and denounced him as an "Agro-bolshevik" to Hindenburg.

The president, having a personal conflict as owner of a highly indebted Junker estate, refused to sign any further emergency decrees. As a consequence, Brüning and his cabinet resigned on 30 May 1932, "100 metres before the finish", and he was relieved of his office in a brief and undignified ceremony by Hindenburg. He firmly rejected all suggestions of making the president's disloyal behaviour public because he considered such a move indecent, and still considered Hindenburg the "last bulwark" of the German people.

After his resignation
After Brüning resigned as chancellor, Centre Party chairman Ludwig Kaas asked Brüning to replace him, but the former chancellor declined and asked Kaas to stay. Brüning supported his party's determined opposition to his successor, Franz von Papen. He also supported re-establishing a working Reichstag by cooperating with the Nazis, negotiating with Gregor Strasser.

After Hitler became chancellor on 30 January 1933, Brüning vigorously campaigned against the new government in the March 1933 elections. Later that month, he vehemently opposed Hitler's Enabling Act, calling it the "most monstrous resolution ever demanded of a parliament." But having received assurances from Hitler that the Centre Party would not be banned, he yielded to party discipline and voted in favour of the bill. With the Communist deputies already banned from the Reichstag, only the Social Democrats voted against the act.

Kaas, a priest, moved to Rome in 1933 to help the Vatican negotiate with Germany. So in May 1933 he resigned as party chairman, and Brüning was elected chairman on 6 May. Hoping to adapt to the post-Enabling Act order, the party adopted a watered-down version of the leadership principle; pro-Centre papers now declared that the party's members, or "retinue", would fully submit to Brüning. This only served to buy the party just a few more months of life. Prominent members were frequently arrested and beaten, pro-Centre civil servants were fired, and Nazi officials demanded that the party either dissolve or else it would be banned. Bowing to the inevitable, Brüning dissolved the Centre Party on 5 July.

Exile and later years
In 1934, Brüning was warned by friends of the imminent Night of the Long Knives. On 3 June, 27 days before the purge, he fled Germany via the Netherlands. 

After staying in Switzerland and the United Kingdom, he went to the United States in 1935. In 1937 he became a visiting professor at Harvard University, and he was the Lucius N. Littauer Professor of Government at Harvard from 1939 to 1952. He became a member of the American Academy of Arts and Sciences in 1938. He warned the American public about Hitler's plans for war, and later about Soviet aggression and plans for expansion, but in both cases his advice went largely unheeded.

In 1951, he returned to Germany, settling in Cologne in West Germany, where he taught as a professor of political science at the University of Cologne until he retired in 1953. Partly because of his dissatisfaction with chancellor Konrad Adenauer's policies, he returned to the U.S. in 1955. There he revised the manuscript of his Memoirs 1918–1934, which was edited by his longtime assistant, Claire Nix.

Due to the memoirs' highly controversial content, they were not published until after his death in 1970.  Parts of the memoirs are considered unreliable, not based on historical records, and a self-justification for his politics during the Weimar Republic.

Brüning died 30 March 1970 in Norwich, Vermont, and was buried in his home town of Münster.

References

Bibliography 

.
.
 Nekrich, Aleksandr Moiseevich. Pariahs, Partners, Predators: German-Soviet Relations, 1922–1941 (Columbia University Press, 1997).
.
.

External links

Online-Biography of Heinrich Brüning 
 
 Heinrich Brüning Papers on Lecturing at Dartmouth College at Dartmouth College Library

1885 births
1970 deaths
20th-century Chancellors of Germany
People from Münster
German Roman Catholics
Centre Party (Germany) politicians
University of Bonn alumni
Alumni of the London School of Economics
Chancellors of Germany
Finance ministers of Germany
Foreign Ministers of Germany
Leaders of political parties in Germany
People from the Province of Westphalia
Prussian politicians
People of the Weimar Republic
German expatriates in the United Kingdom
German expatriates in the United States
Members of the Reichstag of the Weimar Republic
Harvard University faculty
Academic staff of the University of Cologne
Fellows of the American Academy of Arts and Sciences
Burials at Münster Cathedral
German monarchists
Roman Catholics in the German Resistance